Hollensville is an unincorporated community in Audrain County, in the U.S. state of Missouri.

History
A post office was established at Hollensville in 1896, and remained in operation until 1907. J. W. Hollingshead, an early postmaster, gave the community his last name.

References

Unincorporated communities in Audrain County, Missouri
Unincorporated communities in Missouri